Rodica Ramer is a Romanian born Australian professor of microelectronics at the University of New South Wales, where she and her team  work on the development of radio-frequency microelectronic technologies, advancing wireless communication technology. She earned a Ph.D from the University of Bucharest in solid-state physics in 1992. Prior to working at UNSW, she was a senior research scientist at the Microwave Laboratory, National Centre for Nuclear Energy of Romania, a research associate at the Superconductivity Laboratory, the University of Alabama, Tuscaloosa, and at the Microwave Laboratory, Colorado State University, Fort Collins. She is a fellow of the Electromagnetics Academy.

She has authored over 200 publications  and holds  a number of patents relating to microwave waveguide devices and antennas.

Selected publications

References 

Australian women engineers
Australian women physicists
Australian people of Romanian descent
University of Bucharest alumni
Academic staff of the University of New South Wales
1933 births
Living people